Snedden is a surname. Notable people with the surname include:

 Billy Snedden (1926–1987), Australian politician
 Bob Snedden (1867–1931), South African rugby union footballer
 Charles Willis "Bill" Snedden (1913-1989), publisher of the Fairbanks Daily News-Miner from 1950
 Colin Snedden (1918–2011), New Zealand cricketer
 James Snedden (1849 - 1919?), Scottish-born recipient of the Medal of Honor for valor during the American Civil War
 Martin Snedden (born 1958), New Zealand cricketer
 Nessie Snedden (1892–1968), New Zealand cricketer
 Warwick Snedden (1920–1990), New Zealand cricketer

See also
 Sneddon (disambiguation)